Nova – Center for Social Innovation promotes social innovation to help generate alternative socioeconomic models to globalization, a culture of peace based on civil alternatives of defense and a more sustainable and participatory society.

Nova works with organizations and institutions interested in starting projects that promote social innovation and provide participative tools and services that allow citizens to become actively involved in these processes.

The Nova association was founded in the year 2000, but the team behind it has the experience of having taken active part in the Centre d'Estudis Joan Bardina (1983–1991) and EcoConcern (1992–1999), where it organized the Catalan Forum for Rethinking Society (1996–2001) within the framework of the Alliance for a Responsible, Plural and United World (1995–2001). Since 2003, Nova is a member of Nonviolent Peaceforce and through its NoViolenciaActiva Team (known as "Forces de Pau Noviolentes" until 2006) it promotes activities on the culture of peace and nonviolence, attempting to implement systems of nonviolent intervention and civilian resistance in conflict areas.

Since 2008, Nova has been working on the project Barcelona Consensus: Intercultural Alternatives to Neoliberal Globalization.

External links
 http://www.nova.cat/
 http://www.barcelonaconsensus.org/

Social change
Anti-globalization organizations